The 1987 Volvo International was a men's tennis tournament played on outdoor hard courts at the Stratton Mountain Resort in Stratton Mountain, Vermont, United States, and was part of the 1987 Nabisco Grand Prix. It was the 15th edition of the tournament and was held from August 3 through August 10, 1987.

Finals

Singles

No Winner as the final was abandoned  Ivan Lendl and  John McEnroe both received runners-up finishes.

Doubles

 Paul Annacone /  Christo van Rensburg vs.  Ken Flach /  Robert Seguso
 Both the men's singles and doubles finals were cancelled due to rain.

External links
 ITF tournament edition details

 
Volvo International
Volvo International
Volvo International
Volvo International